Chakloo (in revenue record named Chakla) is a village on the bank of the Jhelum River, in the Baramulla District of Jammu and Kashmir, India. It is 7 km from the Baramulla. There are two bridges which connect the village to Kanispora via Ladoora, and Kawaja Bagh via Jambazpora respectively. Its Block is Nadihal, Constituency Rafiabad, Post Office Rohama, Zone/ Police Station/ Tehsil/ District Baramulla, and Jammu and Kashmir. There are Eight Mohalas in the village namely sadeeque colony, Alnoor colony,Usmaan Abaad, Eidgah colony, Gazi Mohalla,sofi mohalla, Dar Mohalla, and Peer Mohalla. Recently the village was given a new administrative unit (Nayabat).

Education
The village has one high school namely Government Boys High School Chakloo, three middle schools namely Government Girls Middle School Chakloo, Sheikh-Ul-Aalam Model Public School Chakloo, Green Hills Model Public School Chakloo, Hanfia Model School Chakloo and one primary school namely Government Primary School Gazi Mihalla Chakloo Baramulla. All these schools impart quality education to all this students of the village. The literacy rate is 75% in males and 55% in females,and overall literacy rate is 65%. Compared to other villages in Rafiabad this village has higher literacy rate. The village is popular because of its decent/high quality education system. The students of this village are currently studying in top colleges and universities in the India. This village is well known for its renowned personalities like Islamic Professors, Engineers, Doctors, Teachers and some famous Kashmiri Poets.

Population
The village has a population of approximately 20-30 thousand people and is headed by panchayat committee. The income of the people in the village is mostly from agricultural lands and fruit orchards, particularly apples.The village also contains  vast area of Paddy, Maize, Walnut ,Almonds fields and become source of income to 75% population of the village. The village also had AQUA IMPEX FOOD COMPANY CHAKLOO/JANBANZPORA BARAMULLA and is also creating employment opportunities for the village. Chakloo has a playground known by the name of Sheikh-Ul-Aalam cricket ground and is located near Govt Boys High Chakloo. Chakloo Rafiabad is known for its fruit business.

Religion and language
There are six Mosques namely Jamia Masjid Gazi Mohalla,Masjid Bait-ul-allah,Masjid Noor,Masjid Sadweeq,Masjid Taqwa,Masjid Usman in the village. There are shrines of two imams located in the village. One is Saatar Sahib situated in Jamia Masjid Gazi Mohalla and another one is Gayab Shah wali situated in Dar Mohalla of the village. The main languages are Kashmiri, Urdu and English, and the primary religion is Islam.

References

Villages in Baramulla district